Ink was a weekly publication targeted to Northeast Indiana's Black community. Based in Fort Wayne, Indiana, Ink was published by Diversity Media Group, Inc., a locally owned, family-owned company founded in 2001 by siblings Vince Robinson and Terri Miller.

Description
Known for its use of design, color and photographs, Ink distinguished itself with its consistent coverage of local issues and events. The paper had a weekly circulation of more than 9,500 readers thanks to a combination of paid subscribers, single-copy purchasers and free distribution to more than 100 area Black churches in Fort Wayne, Kokomo, and Marion, Indiana. Ink has been honored with a number of awards, including the Greater Fort Wayne Chamber of Commerce Diversity Business Award, the NAACP's Media Award and the U.S. Small Business Administration's Indiana Journalist of the Year award for editor-in-chief Vince Robinson.

There is now a similar newspaper called Ink Spot Newspaper.

Sister publications
Inks sister publications include:

Fort Wayne Reader, a twice-monthly arts and entertainment newspaper
Fort Wayne Black Business & Professional Directory (also known as the Fort Wayne Black Pages), an annual listing of Black businesses and professionals in Northeast Indiana.

References

External links
Ink newspaper

Newspapers published in Fort Wayne, Indiana
Defunct African-American newspapers
2001 establishments in Indiana
Defunct newspapers published in Indiana